Liang Zipeng (1900–1974) is a noted Liuhebafa Master from China who went to Hong Kong in the 1946. He was an instructor in Liuhebafa, T'ai chi, Baguazhang, Yi chuan and Xingyi Quan and other arts.

Liang Zipeng studied Liuhebafa with a student of Wu Yi Hui named Li Dao Li for six years during the World War. While Wu Yi Hui returned to Shanghai in 1945 and restarted his classes, Liang Zipeng was recommended by Li Dao Li to teach. This was the account of Li's son.

Although one of the 25 a recognized student of Wu Yi Hui, Liang Zipeng only studied the first half of the Liuhebafa public form called Building the Foundations (Zhu Ji) from Wu Yihui, and created his own personal second half from knowledge of other styles, thus the difference in his Liuhebafa from the mainstream.}
Liang Zipeng's Liu He Ba Fa form can be seen as being mostly influenced by Baguazhang with influences from Tai Chi Chuan, Yiquan and Xingyiquan.

Liang learnt Yi chuan in Shanghai from Dr Yu Pengxi, a student of Wang Xiangzhai, the Founder of Yiquan. Liang Zipeng's Yiquan style was called Southern Yiquan.

Liang learnt Jiang Style Baguazhang from Jiang Rong Qiao at the Chin Woo Athletic Association.

References

External links

1900 births
1974 deaths